Loco Motive is an album by American country rapper Cowboy Troy. Released in 2005 as his first album for Warner Bros. Records, it features the single "I Play Chicken with the Train", which rose to 48 on the Hot Country Songs chart in 2005. The other singles "If You Don't Wanna Love Me" and "My Last Yee Haw" were also released, although neither charted.

Track listing
"I Play Chicken with the Train" (Angie Aparo, John Rich, Cowboy Troy) – 3:16
chorus: Big & Rich
"Crick in My Neck" (Rich, Cowboy Troy) – 3:20
background vocals: Big & Rich
"Ain't Broke Yet" (Big Kenny, Rich, Cowboy Troy) – 4:09
chorus, background vocals: Big & Rich
"If You Don't Wanna Love Me" (Rich, Cowboy Troy) – 5:24
duet vocals: Sarah Buxton
spoken intro to "My Last Yee Haw": Larry the Cable Guy
"My Last Yee Haw" (Kenny, Rich, Cowboy Troy) – 3:27
chorus: Big & Rich
"El Tejano" (Rich, Cowboy Troy) – 3:36
"Somebody's Smilin' on Me" (Brett Warren, Cowboy Troy) – 4:01
chorus: Tim McGraw and Big Kenny
"Do Your Thang" (John Phillips, Cowboy Troy, Jill Kinsey) – 3:35
chorus: Jill Kinsey
"Beast on the Mic" (Adam Shoenfeld, Cowboy Troy) – 3:26
background vocals, chorus: James Otto
"Whoop Whoop" (Vicky McGehee, Rich, Cowboy Troy) – 3:10
background vocals, chorus: Jon Nicholson
"Automatic" (Adam Shoenfeld, Rich, Cowboy Troy) – 4:23
chorus: Adam Shoenfeld (credited as ATOM)
"Wrap Around the World" (Rich, Cowboy Troy) – 3:50
chorus: Big & Rich

Personnel

 Paul "PDA" Allen – acoustic guitar, electric guitar
 Brian Barnett – drums, percussion
 Sarah Buxton – vocals on track 4
 Big Kenny – vocals on tracks 1, 2, 3, 5, 7, 12
 Joan Bush – background vocals
 Cowboy Troy – lead vocals
 Dan Dugmore – dobro, lap steel guitar
 Larry the Cable Guy – spoken intro on track 4
 Larry Franklin – fiddle
 Mike Johnson – pedal steel guitar
 Jill Kinsey – vocals on track 8
 Randy Kohrs – dobro
 Liana Manis – background vocals
 Tim McGraw – vocals on track 7
 Jon Nicholson – vocals on track 10
 James Otto – vocals on track 9
 James Pennebaker – electric guitar
 Ethan Pilzer – bass guitar
 John Rich – acoustic guitar, vocals on tracks 1, 2, 3, 5, 12
 Mike Rojas – farfisa organ, Hammond B-3 organ, piano, synthesizer
 Adam Shoenfeld – electric guitar, vocals on track 11
 Paul Worley – background vocals
 Jonathan Yudkin – banjo, fiddle, mandolin, string arrangements, strings

Charts

Weekly charts

Year-end charts

References

2005 albums
Cowboy Troy albums
Warner Records albums
Albums produced by Paul Worley
Albums produced by John Rich